Valentyna Petrivna Semenyuk-Samsonenko (4 June 1957 – 27 August 2014) was a Ukrainian politician.

The body of Semenyuk-Samsonenko was found with firearms wound to head on 27 August 2014 at 19:00 local time in the suburb of Kyiv village of Chaiky (Kyiv-Sviatoshyn Raion). The body was discovered by Semenyuk's daughter. The official cause of death was suicide. Police closed criminal proceedings over the death in April 2017.

Semenyuk-Samsonenko was married to businessman Vitaly Samsonenko from 2008 to 2012. Her first husband was Anatoliy Semenyuk, the couple raised two daughters. Anatoliy Semenyuk died in 1995.

References

External links
 The ex-director of State Property Fund was found dead in her house. Ukrayinska Pravda. 27 August 2014.
 Former director of State Property Fund Semenyuk-Samsonenko was found shot out of rifle. UNIAN. 27 August 2014.
 Valentyna Semenyuk-Samsonenko was found shot in her house. Mirror Weekly. 27 August 2014.

1957 births
2014 deaths
People from Zhytomyr Oblast
Zhytomyr National Agroecological University alumni
Yaroslav Mudryi National Law University alumni
Second convocation members of the Verkhovna Rada
Third convocation members of the Verkhovna Rada
Fourth convocation members of the Verkhovna Rada
Fifth convocation members of the Verkhovna Rada
Directors of the State Property Fund of Ukraine
Communist Party of Ukraine (Soviet Union) politicians
Communist Party of Ukraine politicians
Socialist Party of Ukraine politicians
Deaths by firearm in Ukraine
20th-century Ukrainian women politicians
21st-century Ukrainian women politicians
Ukrainian politicians who committed suicide
Women members of the Verkhovna Rada